The  New York lunar sample displays are two commemorative plaques consisting of small fragments of Moon specimen brought back with the Apollo 11 and Apollo 17 lunar missions and given in the 1970s to the people of the state of New York by United States President Richard Nixon as goodwill gifts.

Description

Apollo 11

Apollo 17

History 

The New York Apollo 17 "goodwill Moon rocks" plaque display is located at the New York State Museum in secure storage.

The online publication collectSpace has no record of the location of the New York Apollo 11 lunar sample display as of 2012.

See also
 List of Apollo lunar sample displays

References

Further reading 
 

Stolen and missing moon rocks
Tourist attractions in New York (state)